La Garde Township is a township in Mahnomen County, Minnesota, United States. The township was named for Moses Lagarde, an early settler.

Geography

Demographics
At the 2000 census, there were 137 people, 43 households and 30 families residing in the township. The racial make-up of the township was 68.61% White, 23.36% Native American and 8.03% from two or more races.

There were 43 households, of which 41.9% had children under the age of 18 living with them, 62.8% were married couples living together and 30.2% were non-families. 30.2% of all households were made up of individuals and 11.6% had someone living alone who was 65 years of age or older. The average household size was 2.81 and the average family size was 3.60.

27.7% of the pupulation were under the age of 18, 6.6% from 18 to 24, 24.1% from 25 to 44, 27.0% from 45 to 64 and 14.6% were 65 years of age or older. The median age was 39 years. For every 100 females there were 136.2 males. For every 100 females age 18 and over, there were 147.5 males.

The median household income was $31,563 and the median family income was $39,375. Males had a median income of $16,875 and females $16,563. The per capita income was $9,926. There were 8.7% of families and 19.7% of the population living below the poverty line, including 12.2% of under eighteens and 40.9% of those over 64.

References

Townships in Mahnomen County, Minnesota
Townships in Minnesota